James W. Cloes (July 26, 1850 – April 7, 1919) was an American politician in the state of Washington. He served in the Washington House of Representatives.

References

Republican Party members of the Washington House of Representatives
1850 births
1919 deaths
Politicians from Cleveland
19th-century American politicians